Francesco Della Rocca (born 14 September 1987) is an Italian footballer who plays as a central midfielder.

Club career

Bologna
A Bologna youth product, he spent the early years of his professional career on loan to minor league clubs before playing his first full Serie A season in 2010–11.

Palermo
On 23 August 2011, he signed a new five-year contract with Bologna, but left the club only a week later to join Palermo in a co-ownership bid, for €3.5 million.

In summer 2012, he joined ACF Fiorentina. However, he was injured in September 2012. On 12 January 2013, he moved on loan to Siena, and then spent the 2013–14 season on loan at his old club Bologna, playing only nine times.

He returned to Palermo after the end of his loan spell on 1 July 2014, and was called up for the Rosaneros first team pre-season camp. In summer 2014, Palermo also acquired the remain 50% registration rights of Della Rocca, for a peppercorn fee of €500.

On 30 August 2015, the contract of Palermo and Della Rocca was canceled in mutual consent.

Perugia
On 30 August 2015, Della Rocca was signed by Perugia.

Salernitana
On 31 August 2016, he joined Salernitana in a two-year deal.

Padova
On 9 July 2018, he joined Serie B club Padova, signing a one-year contract with an additional one-year extension option. His contract was dissolved by mutual consent on 31 January 2019.

Personal life
He is the younger brother of Luigi Della Rocca.

References

External links
 Francesco Della Rocca's National Team Stats at FIGC.it 
 Player Statistics at football.it 
 

1987 births
Living people
People from Brindisi
Footballers from Apulia
Association football midfielders
Italian footballers
Serie A players
Serie B players
Bologna F.C. 1909 players
Brescia Calcio players
U.S. Avellino 1912 players
U.S. Sassuolo Calcio players
A.S. Sambenedettese players
A.C. Perugia Calcio players
Palermo F.C. players
ACF Fiorentina players
A.C.N. Siena 1904 players
U.S. Salernitana 1919 players
Calcio Padova players
Sportspeople from the Province of Brindisi